Devoured is a 2012 dramatic horror film that was directed by Greg Olliver and is his feature film directorial debut. The film had its world premiere on May 6, 2012 at the Bilbao Fantasy Film Festival and stars Marta Milans as a hardworking young woman that begins to experience strange visions.

Synopsis
Lourdes (Marta Milans) is a young woman from El Salvador that has come to New York City in hopes of raising enough money to help care for her ill son, who lives with Lourdes's mother back in her home country. She works in an upscale restaurant where her boss mistreats her, her boss's boyfriend sexually assaults her, and various men forcefully solicit her for sexual favors. Lourdes endures all of this as she cannot afford to lose her job and while she is reluctant to prostitute herself, she will do anything in order to raise enough money for her son's surgery. Her only solace is found in her phone calls to her son in El Salvador and her interactions with Frankie (Bruno Gunn), a firefighter that is the only person in New York who has shown Lourdes any true kindness. While cleaning the restaurant one night, Lourdes begins to experience strange visions where she sees strange shadowy figures that seem out to get her.

Cast
Marta Milans as Lourdes
Kara Jackson as Kristen
Bruno Gunn as Friendly Frankie Callahan
Tyler Hollinger as Billy
Luis Harris as Oliver
Sal Rendino as Henry
David Conley as Detective Cruthers
Jim O'Hare as Man in Black
Richard Alleman as Man Eating Alone
Eric Lommel as Kitchen Staff #1
Dixon Gutierrez as Kitchen Staff #2
Rennel Turner as Officer #1
Jaime Carrillo as Officer #2
Annie Lee Moffett as Lourdes' Old Friend
Amy Landon as Detective Sullivan

Reception
Critical reception for Devoured has been predominantly positive, and the film has received praise from multiple horror review websites. Opinions were polarized on the film's pacing, which some reviewers felt could deter some viewers while others saw it as adding to the movie's overall feel. We Got This Covered gave Devoured four out of five stars and wrote "From magnificent production to all around tantalizing psychological horror, Devoured will surely give you a good haunting, as well as present enough substance to take a hearty bite out of along the way."

Awards
Best Director Award at the New York City Horror Film Festival (2012, won)
Best Actress Award at the New York City Horror Film Festival (2012, won - Marta Milans)

References

External links
 

2012 films
2012 horror films
Films set in New York City
2010s psychological horror films
American psychological horror films
2012 directorial debut films
2010s American films